Monosomy 9p (also known as Alfi's Syndrome or simply 9P-) is a rare chromosomal disorder in which some DNA is missing or has been deleted on the short arm region, “p”, of one of the 9th Chromosomes (9p22.2-p23). This deletion either happens de novo or a result of a parent having the chromosome abnormality. This rare chromosome abnormality is often diagnosed after birth when development delay, irregular facial features, and structural irregularities within the heart, and genital defects are noticed. Treatments for this syndrome usually focus on fixing the common malformations associated with this syndrome. Chromosome 9p deletion syndrome was first discovered in 1973 when 3 infants with similar clinical features were observed to have a partial deletion of the short arm of Chromosome 9. Symptoms include microgenitalia, intellectual disability with microcephaly and dysmorphic features.

Signs and Symptoms

Psychomotor Development Delays 
Psychomotor development refers to the changes experienced directly after birth through adolescence. Development occurs in cognitive, emotional, motor, and social skills over the child's growth and a delay can result in lagging development of language, motor skills, cognition, or social skills, however these delays can vary in severity.

Facial Dysmorphism 
Facial Dysmorphisms broadly describe any abnormalities in facial structure. Facial Dysmorphisms include slopping forehead, frontal bossing (prominent protruding forehead), hemifacial microsomia (one side of the face underdeveloped), and otocephaly (absence of mandible and fusion of ears under chin).

Malformation of Limbs 
Congenital limb defects occur when a fetus' limbs, either upper or lower, experience altered development. These developmental abnormalities include absence of the limb, failure of portions of the limb to separate (commonly fingers and toes), duplication of digits, or overgrowth or undergrowth of limbs.

Genetics

Inheritance Pattern 
The inheritance pattern for the Chromosome 9p deletion syndrome is inherited in an autosomal dominant inheritance pattern. This means that a single copy of the deletion is sufficient to cause the disease.

Mutation 
The mutation, which occurs in the form of a deletion of the short arm of chromosome 9, causes the cell to not express the gene products normally controlled by the genes within the chromosome 9 deletion.

Genes Involved 
The 9p deletion causes a loss of genes that would normally be there. Which genes are lost on the short arm of chromosome 9 dictates the symptoms that are present within the individual and the spectrum of disease severity. Most of the genes involved are associated with the development of tissues.

There are many possible genes that can be deleted, but two particular genes that are proven to be involved in the emergence of the symptoms associated with Chromosome 9p deletion syndrome are DMRT1 and DMRT2. When DMRT1 and DMRT2 are deleted, genital malformations and mental retardation are evident although, the direct mechanisms as to how this occurs remains undefined.

Location 
Geneticists originally had the syndrome narrowed down to the short arm region of Chromosome 9. Now, the location of the deletion has recently been narrowed to 9p22.2-p23.

Diagnosis 
Diagnoses can occur at any age. Most of time chromosome 9p deletion syndrome is diagnosed after birth by the detection of symptoms via clinical evaluation. Common methods used to detect Monosomy 9p after birth include the use of a stethoscope, X-ray, and EKG. Monosomy 9p is also diagnosed before birth by ultrasound, amniocentesis, and chorionic villus sampling (CVS). Ultrasound can hint at the malformations of the face, limbs, and heart. While amniocentesis and CVS both use fluid and tissue to perform chromosomal studies to identify chromosomal abnormalities. Finally, karyotyping, a procedure used to examine a patient's chromosomes, can be used to diagnose Monosomy 9p both before birth and after birth.

Management  
Treatment of Monosomy 9p focuses mainly on fixing the malformations. For example, to fix facial malformations, physicians can perform facial surgery to repair the facial malformations. This can open airways for the infant or patient; especially the nose-to-throat pathway. Similarly, to fix heart malformations, physicians can recommend surgery or medication to improve the efficiency of the pumping of the heart. Lastly remedial education, speech therapy, and physical therapy can be used to improve the developmental delay associated with the syndrome.

Epidemiology 
Chromosome 9p deletion syndrome occurs 1 in 50,000 births. Half of the cases occur sporadically, while the other half of cases result from parent translocations or the parent having deletion as well.

References

External links 

Autosomal monosomies and deletions